Havensville is a city in Pottawatomie County, Kansas, United States.  As of the 2020 census, the population of the city was 119.

History
Havensville had its start in the year 1878 by the building of the railroad through that territory. It was named for Paul E. Havens, a railroad employee.

The first post office in Havensville was established in March 1878.

Geography
Havensville is located at  (39.510473, -96.077360).

Climate
This climatic region is typified by large seasonal temperature differences, with warm to hot (and often humid) summers and cold (sometimes severely cold) winters.  According to the Köppen Climate Classification system, Havensville has a humid continental climate, abbreviated "Dfa" on climate maps.

Demographics

Havensville is part of the Manhattan, Kansas Metropolitan Statistical Area.

2010 census
As of the census of 2010, there were 133 people, 58 households, and 41 families residing in the city. The racial makeup of the city was 98.5% White, 0.8% from other races, and 0.8% from two or more races. Hispanic or Latino of any race were 3.8% of the population.

There were 58 households, of which 22.4% had children under the age of 18 living with them, 58.6% were married couples living together, 8.6% had a female householder with no husband present, 3.4% had a male householder with no wife present, and 29.3% were non-families. 25.9% of all households were made up of individuals, and 6.9% had someone living alone who was 65 years of age or older. The average household size was 2.29 and the average family size was 2.73.

The median age in the city was 45.8 years. 20.3% of residents were under the age of 18; 3.9% were between the ages of 18 and 24; 24.8% were from 25 to 44; 38.3% were from 45 to 64; and 12.8% were 65 years of age or older. The gender makeup of the city was 55.6% male and 44.4% female.

2000 census
As of the census of 2000, there were 146 people, 64 households, and 41 families residing in the city. The racial makeup of the city was 95.21% White, 0.68% African American, 0.68% Native American, 0.68% from other races, and 2.74% from two or more races. Hispanic or Latino of any race were 2.74% of the population.

There were 64 households, out of which 29.7% had children under the age of 18 living with them, 60.9% were married couples living together, 4.7% had a female householder with no husband present, and 34.4% were non-families. 32.8% of all households were made up of individuals, and 12.5% had someone living alone who was 65 years of age or older. The average household size was 2.28 and the average family size was 2.90.

In the city, the population was spread out, with 24.7% under the age of 18, 6.2% from 18 to 24, 31.5% from 25 to 44, 20.5% from 45 to 64, and 17.1% who were 65 years of age or older. The median age was 39 years. For every 100 females, there were 117.9 males. For every 100 females age 18 and over, there were 100.0 males.

The median income for a household in the city was $26,875, and the median income for a family was $43,125. Males had a median income of $31,250 versus $17,000 for females. The per capita income for the city was $18,043. There were 7.9% of families and 10.9% of the population living below the poverty line, including 22.6% of under eighteens and 6.9% of those over 64.

Education
The community is served by Onaga USD 322 public school district.

References

Further reading

External links
 Havensville - Directory of Public Officials
 Havensville city map, KDOT

Cities in Kansas
Cities in Pottawatomie County, Kansas
Manhattan, Kansas metropolitan area
1878 establishments in Kansas
Populated places established in 1878